This was the first edition of the tournament.

Tomás Martín Etcheverry won the title after defeating Hugo Dellien 6–3, 6–2 in the final.

Seeds

Draw

Finals

Top half

Bottom half

References

External links
Main draw
Qualifying draw

Challenger del Biobío - 1